Maurice John Moreau (1 April 1927 – 18 March 2003) was a Liberal party member of the House of Commons of Canada. He was born in Dollard, Saskatchewan and became a consulting engineer by career.

He was first elected at the York—Scarborough riding in the 1963 general election after an initial unsuccessful attempt there in 1962. After completing his only term, the 26th Canadian Parliament, Moreau left the House of Commons and did not seek another term in the 1965 election.

External links
 

1927 births
2003 deaths
Members of the House of Commons of Canada from Ontario
Liberal Party of Canada MPs
Fransaskois people